Promethichthys prometheus, the Roudi escolar, is a species of snake mackerel native to the warm temperate and tropical waters of all the oceans where it occurs at depths of from  (mostly between ).  This species grows to a length of  SL though most do not exceed  SL.  It is important to local peoples as a food fish and is popular as a game fish though it has been reported to carry the ciguatera toxin.  It is also utilized as bait.  This species is the only known member of its genus.

See also
Escolar

References

Gempylidae
Monotypic fish genera